Ego Magazine was an online magazine geared towards the Desi [South Asian] diaspora. It published articles on culture, fashion, design, travel & entertainment. It also had sections on economic & political issues, technology and translations of Urdu and Hindi poetry. A highly popular online magazine, it was read by over 35,000 regular readers a month from over 55 countries when it started in 2003 and was particularly popular in the United States, Canada, Britain and Australia.

EGO Magazine [Dec 2003 - Sep 2011] was founded by Ayesha Khanna and headquartered in Manhattan, New York.

See also
Indian American
Pakistani American

References

External links
 Official web site

Lifestyle magazines published in the United States
Online magazines published in the United States
Defunct magazines published in the United States
Magazines established in 2003
Magazines disestablished in 2011
Magazines published in New York City